Pierre Danloux (28 May 1878 – December 1943) was a French equestrian. He competed in two events at the 1928 Summer Olympics.

References

External links
 

1878 births
1943 deaths
French male equestrians
Olympic equestrians of France
Equestrians at the 1928 Summer Olympics
People from Compiègne
Sportspeople from Oise